Oliva caroliniana, common name the carolinian olive shell, is a species of sea snail, a marine gastropod mollusk in the family Olividae, the olives.

Description

Distribution
This marine species occurs in Micronesia off the Caroline Islands.

References

caroliniana
Gastropods described in 1835